Perov (from перо meaning feather or nib) is a Russian masculine surname, its feminine counterpart is Perova.  Notable people with the surname include:

 Aleksandr Perov (cyclist) (born 1955), Soviet cyclist 
 Aleksandr Perov (footballer) (born 1978), Russian professional football coach and a former player
 Aleksandra Perova (born 1982), Russian slalom canoer
 Anatoly Perov (1926–2001), a Soviet boxer
 Andrei Perov (born 1981), a Russian professional footballer
 Elena Perova (born 1976), Russian singer and musician
 Ivan Perov (1910—1989), Soviet submariner, Hero of the Soviet Union
 Ksenia Perova (born 1989), Russian archer
 Vasily Perov (1834–1882), a Russian painter and one of the founding members of Peredvizhniki

Russian-language surnames